Elboya is a residential neighbourhood in the southwest quadrant of Calgary, Alberta. It is bounded by the Elbow River to the north, 4th Street SW / 45 Avenue SW / Macleod Trail to the east, 50 Avenue S to the south and Elbow Drive to the west. Stanley Park borders the community to the northeast.

It was annexed to the City of Calgary in 1910, and was established as a neighbourhood in 1947, when most of the development occurred. It is represented in the Calgary City Council by the Ward 11 councillor.

Demographics

Residents in this community had a median household income of $62,374 in 2000, and there were 16% low income residents living in the neighbourhood. As of 2000, 17.1% of the residents were immigrants. A proportion of 37.4% of the buildings were condominiums or apartments, and 39.2% of the housing was used for renting.

Education
The community is served by the Elboya Bilingual Elementary & Junior High public school and St. Anthony (Catholic school).

See also
List of neighbourhoods in Calgary

References

External links
Elboya Heights Community Association

Neighbourhoods in Calgary